TESST College of Technology is a private for-profit technical college located in metropolitan Baltimore, Maryland. It is owned and operated by Education Corporation of America.

History
TESST College of Technology began offering instruction in electronics in 1957 as TESST Technology Institute. The campus was located in Hyattsville, Maryland. In December 1992, TESST expanded its reach in the Baltimore market by acquiring the Arundel Institute of Technology. In the summer of 1998, the Hyattsville and Baltimore campuses relocated to new buildings in Beltsville and Towson, Maryland.

In 1999, TESST acquired RETS Technical Training Center, which had been offering classes in Maryland since 1956. In June 2001, TESST Technology Institute received approval to offer associate of applied science degrees in network information systems and electronics, computer, and telecommunications technology. All campuses then became known as TESST College of Technology.

In May 2002, the college was acquired by Quest Education Corporation, a subsidiary of Kaplan, Inc. In December 2002, Quest changed its name to Kaplan Higher Education Corporation. In March 2004, the campus expanded by adding a  facility located at 3922 Vero Road, less than a mile from the campus.

In September 2015, TESST College of Technology was acquired by Education Corporation of America.

Campuses
There are 3 campuses: Baltimore Campus (698 students), Beltsville Campus (413 students) and Towson Campus (322 students).

Academics
TESST College of Technology offers programs in the following fields:

Allied Health Medical Assistant (Certificate); Medical Billing and Coding Specialist (Certificate); Pharmacy Technician (Certificate)
Information Technology: Computer Support Technician (Certificate); Computer Networking Technology (Associate of Applied Science)
Trades:  Electrician (Certificate); Heating, Ventilation, and Air Conditioning/Refrigeration (Certificate)
Criminal Justice (Associate of Applied Science)
Continuing Education: Drywall Technician course, Phlebotomy Technician course and Security Plus test prep course

References

External links
TESST College of Technology - Official website
Reference from www.1888edu.com Retrieved on 2009-08-11.
Reference from the US Department of Education. Retrieved on 2009-08-12.
TESST College of Technology - Baltimore
TESST College of Technology - Beltsville
TESST College of Technology - Towson

Private universities and colleges in Maryland
Universities and colleges in Baltimore County, Maryland
Beltsville, Maryland
Hyattsville, Maryland
Baltimore County, Maryland landmarks